Alvin Hart may refer to:

 Alvin Youngblood Hart (born 1963), American musician
 Alvin N. Hart (1804–1874), American jurist and politician in Michigan